Omar Al-Sonain (born 14 March 1995) is a Saudi professional footballer who plays as a right back.

External links

References

1995 births
Living people
Saudi Arabian footballers
Saudi Arabia youth international footballers
Ettifaq FC players
Al-Kawkab FC players
Al-Sahel SC (Saudi Arabia) players
Saudi First Division League players
Saudi Professional League players
Association football fullbacks